Still Crazy After All These Years is the fourth solo studio album by Paul Simon. Recorded and released in 1975, the album produced four U.S. Top 40 hits: "50 Ways to Leave Your Lover" (No. 1), "Gone at Last" (No. 23), "My Little Town" (No. 9, credited to Simon & Garfunkel), and the title track (No. 40). It won two Grammy Awards for Album of the Year and Best Male Pop Vocal Performance in 1976. 

"My Little Town" reunited Simon with former partner Art Garfunkel on record for the first time since 1970, while "Gone at Last" was a duet between Simon and Phoebe Snow.  Two tracks featured members of the Muscle Shoals Rhythm Section as a backing band.

The title track has been recorded by Rosemary Clooney (on her 1993 album Still on the Road), Ray Charles (on his 1993 album My World), Karen Carpenter (on her self-titled solo album released posthumously in 1996), and Willie Nelson (on the soundtrack of the 2000 motion picture Space Cowboys).

Track listing

Personnel 
 Paul Simon – vocals, acoustic guitar (2, 3, 4, 9), electric guitar (5), string arrangements (7), horn arrangements (7, 9)
 Barry Beckett – Fender Rhodes (1), acoustic piano (2)
 Bob James – woodwind arrangements (1), string arrangements (1, 3), Fender Rhodes (7, 8)
 Kenneth Ascher – Fender Rhodes (3), organ (4)
 Sivuca – accordion (3), vocal solo (3)
 Richard Tee – acoustic piano (6)
 Leon Pendarvis – acoustic piano (10)
 Hilary James – piano
 Pete Carr – electric guitar (2)
 Joe Beck – electric guitar (3, 8, 9) 
 Jerry Friedman – electric guitar (3)
 Hugh McCracken – electric guitar (4, 7, 8), acoustic guitar (9)
 John Tropea – electric guitar (4)
 David Hood – bass (1, 2)
 Tony Levin – bass (3, 4, 5, 7–10)
 Gordon Edwards – bass (6)
 Roger Hawkins – drums (1, 2)
 Steve Gadd – drums (3, 4, 7-10)
 Grady Tate – drums (6) 
 Dave Mattacks – drums (6)
 Ralph MacDonald – percussion (2, 3, 4, 6, 8)
 Toots Thielemans – harmonica (5)
 Michael Brecker – tenor sax solo (1), saxophone (7)
 Eddie Daniels – saxophone (7)
 David Sanborn – saxophone (7) 
 Phil Woods – alto sax solo  (8)
 David Mathews – horn arrangements (2, 8)
 Art Garfunkel – vocals (2)
 Patti Austin – backing vocals (4)
 Valerie Simpson – backing vocals (4, 8)
 Phoebe Snow – backing vocals (4), vocals (6)
 The Jessy Dixon Singers – backing vocals (6)
 Chicago Community Choir – backing vocals (10)

Production 
 Paul Simon – producer 
 Phil Ramone – producer, engineer
 Jerry Masters – engineer (2)
 Glenn Berger – recording 
 Bert Szerlip – recording
 John Berg – design 
 Anthony Maggiore – design 
 Edie Baskin – cover photography

Charts

Weekly charts

Year-end charts

Certifications

References

1975 albums
Paul Simon albums
Grammy Award for Album of the Year
Grammy Award for Best Male Pop Vocal Performance
Albums arranged by David Matthews (keyboardist)
Albums produced by Phil Ramone
Albums produced by Paul Simon
Columbia Records albums